is a railway station in the city of Kamaishi, Iwate, Japan, operated by East Japan Railway Company (JR East).

Lines
Matsukura Station is served by the Kamaishi Line, and is located 83.2 kilometers from the starting point of the line at Hanamaki Station.

Station layout
The station has one side platform serving a single bi-directional track. The station is unattended.

History
Matsukura Station opened on 15 June 1945. The station was absorbed into the JR East network upon the privatization of the Japanese National Railways (JNR) on 1 April 1987.

Surrounding area
 
Matsukura Post Office

See also
 List of railway stations in Japan

References

External links

  

Railway stations in Iwate Prefecture
Kamaishi Line
Railway stations in Japan opened in 1945
Kamaishi, Iwate
Stations of East Japan Railway Company